Sandići is a village in the municipality of Brčko, Bosnia and Herzegovina. František Pubička (1779 - 1801), Czech Jesuit, bohemian historian and dean of the Faculty of Philosophy in his extensive work Chronological history of  Bohemia  under the Slavs  published in the original in German and titled: " 1770–1801:Chronologische geschichte Böhmens." cites the place as "an early Slavic settlement and town of the Sandići noble family with relatives in a fortified city of Bobovac."

It is assumed that a village and its adjoining area was named by or after Sandić noble family. The family originates possibly from the south of Bosnia and Herzegovina, the area between Herzegovina and Old Herzegovina, in the early 15th century.

Demographics 
According to the 2013 census, its population was 430.

References

External links
, Sandić,Aleksandar,1836 –1908, PhD Philosophy,politician,lawyer,publisher and editor of the newspaper Ost und Westin Vienna 1861 – 1865.
Pubitschka ...Chronologische Geschichte Böhmens ...,1770–1801:Chronologische geschichte Böhmens</ref>
, Alexander Sandic auf Vuk Karadzic in deut
,Bibliography: SANDIĆ,Desimir A.-Brotherhood Sandić]()

Villages in Brčko District